Muton's soft-furred mouse or riverine praomys (Praomys mutoni) is a species of rodent in the family Muridae.
It is found only in Democratic Republic of the Congo.
Its natural habitats are subtropical or tropical swampland and rivers.

References

Praomys
Mammals described in 1990
Taxonomy articles created by Polbot
Endemic fauna of the Democratic Republic of the Congo